Dato' Sri Ikmal Hisham Bin Abdul Aziz is a Malaysian politician who has served as the Member of Parliament (MP) for Tanah Merah since May 2013. He served as the Deputy Minister of Defence for the second term in the Barisan Nasional (BN) administration under former Prime Minister Ismail Sabri Yaakob and former Minister Hishammuddin Hussein from August 2021 to the collapse of the BN administration in November 2022 and the first term in the Perikatan Nasional (PN) administration under former Prime Minister Muhyiddin Yassin and former Minister Ismail  Sabri from March 2020 to the collapse of the PN administration in August 2021. He is a member of the Malaysian United Indigenous Party (BERSATU), a component party of the PN and formerly Pakatan Harapan (PH) coalitions and was a member of the United Malays National Organisation (UMNO), a component party of the Barisan Nasional (BN) coalition. After the defeat of BN to PH in 2018 general election, he resigned from UMNO in 2018 and joined BERSATU in 2019.

Political career
In May 2013, Ikmal first contested to become an MP in the 13th Malaysian general election and subsequently won the Tanah Merah seat with a majority of 4747.

He was successfully re-elected as MP for the same seat in the 14th Malaysian general election.

He resigned from UMNO to be an Independent politician in 2018.

Presently he is a member of the Malaysian United Indigenous Party or Parti Pribumi Bersatu Malaysia (BERSATU), a component of Perikatan Nasional (PN) government.

Election results

Honours
  :
  Member of the Order of Sultan Sharafuddin Idris Shah (AIS)
  :
 Knight Companion of the Order of the Crown of Pahang (DIMP) – Dato' (2009)
  Grand Knight of the Order of Sultan Ahmad Shah of Pahang (SSAP) – Dato' Sri (2015)

References

Living people
People from Kelantan
Malaysian people of Malay descent
Malaysian Muslims
Members of the Dewan Rakyat
Year of birth missing (living people)
Former United Malays National Organisation politicians